Myoclonic astatic epilepsy (MAE), also known as myoclonic atonic epilepsy or Doose syndrome, is a generalized idiopathic epilepsy. MAE was first coined in 1970 by Dr. Hermann Doose. It is characterized by the development of myoclonic seizures and/or myoclonic astatic seizures. Some of the common monogenic causes include mutations in the genes SLC6A1 (3p25.3),CHD2 (15q26.1), AP2M1 (10q23.2). Myoclonic atonic epilepsy (MAE) is an intermittent childhood epilepsy syndrome. MAE is characterized by jerking muscle contractions followed by sudden muscle limpness. The onset of MAE (seizure disorder) is in early childhood. Almost all patients with MAE experienced their first seizures before the age of five years. Majority of children with MAE have normal development until the time of diagnosis, though few faces minor delay in development with speech delay. Boys tend to be affected more than girls. Genetics plays a significant role in the cause of this disorder. It is a rare childhood epilepsy, to be found in 1 to 2 out of 100 (1 to 2%) of all childhood-onset epilepsies. For the majority of MAE patients, the first seizure is a generalized tonic-clonic seizure. Even though generalized tonic-clonic seizures are the first seizure that occurred in MAE, few of the patients experienced absence seizures in their onset. For those children, whose onset is after four years they are more likely to experience absence seizures. There is an important role of Genetic in Doose Syndrome. These seizures occur more often in the early hours of the morning during sleep. The seizure response to the medication is very poor. Almost one-third have continuing seizures. The development of children progresses once seizures are controlled. Some children return to their regular functions. But few still remain with fluctuating grades of intellectual disability. Atypical absence often related with reduced muscle tone. Pure atonic seizures may also happen. Generalized tonic seizures are less frequently seen. Though Ancestor and natal history are typical. There is frequently a family history of seizures. The patients are having normal neurological examination and head size. This seizure is considered an 'epileptic encephalopathy. Current indication has suggested possible genetic links to the GEFS+ family. Though the frequency of seizures is more, and also poor cognition outcomes can be surprisingly good.

Signs and symptoms
MAE many myoclonic and myoclonic-atonic seizures. When it occurs, the child suddenly becomes drooping. They may fall to the ground if they are standing.

 Tonic-clonic seizures: seizures with repetitive sequences of stiffening and jerking of the extremities.
 Myoclonic seizures: seizures with rapid, brief contractions of muscles.
 Atonic seizures: seizures with a sudden loss of muscle tone, often resulting in sudden collapse. These are also called drop seizures or astatic seizures.
 Absence seizures: a generalized seizure characterized by staring off and occasionally some orofacial automatisms.
 Myoclonic astatic seizures: seizures that involve a myoclonic seizure followed immediately by an atonic seizure. This type of seizure is exclusive to MAE and is one of the defining characteristics of this syndrome.
 Tonic seizures: muscle stiffening or rigidity. This seizure is rare in this syndrome.
 Non-convulsive status epilepticus: Once the seizures happened the child was unaware of the condition.

Onset
The onset of seizures is between the ages of 2 and 5 years of age. EEG shows regular and irregular bilaterally synchronous 2- to 3-Hz spike-waves and polyspike patterns with a 4- to 7-Hz background. 84% of affected children show normal development prior to seizures; the remainder show moderate psychomotor retardation mainly affecting speech. Boys (74%) are more often affected than girls (Doose and Baier 1987a).

Diagnosis
The estimated prevalence is 1-2% of all childhood epilepsies. Diagnosis is based on medical history, neurologic examination, and electroencephalogram (EEG) findings. Neuroimaging is another diagnostic tool but the findings are mostly normal. Genetic and metabolic testing should be performed in case of suspicious specific genetic mutations.

Treatments
The treatment for seizures may include antiepileptic medications, diet and vagus nerve stimulator.

Medication
Any number of medications may be used to both prevent and treat seizure. Generally after three medications are tried, different treatment should be considered. Some medications are harmful to those with this syndrome and can increase seizures. First-line medications for MAE are ethosuximide, valproic acid, and lamotrigine. Valproate is very effective, however it features more side effects than ethosuximide. Other medications that have been used to treat are topiramate, zonisamide, and levetiracetam.

Diet
The ketogenic diet mimics some of the effects of starvation, in which the body first uses up glucose and glycogen before burning stored body fat. In the absence of glucose, the body produces ketones, a chemical by-product of fat metabolism that has been known to inhibit seizures.

A modified version of a popular low-carbohydrate, high-fat diet which is less restrictive than the ketogenic diet.

The low glycemic index treatment (LGIT) is a new dietary therapy currently being studied to treat epilepsy. LGIT attempts to reproduce the positive effects of the ketogenic diet. The treatment allows a more generous intake of carbohydrates than the ketogenic diet, but is restricted to foods that have a low glycemic index, meaning foods that have a relatively low impact on blood-glucose levels. These foods include meats, cheeses, and most vegetables because these foods have a relatively low glycemic index. Foods do not have to be weighed, but instead careful attention must be paid to portion size and balancing the intake of carbohydrates throughout the day with adequate amounts of fats and proteins.

Rescue Therapy
Children with MAE who have long or groups of seizures need emergency treatment with rescue therapy. Emergency medical treatment starts with the IV and gives medications directly into the blood, that effect speedily. The ideal seizure rescue medication will be one that is outside the hospital one that can be given quickly, easily, safely, and without medical training. Parents of children with MAE should learn about seizure emergencies and options for home rescue medication.

Prognosis
Epilepsy with myoclonic-astatic seizures has a variable course and outcome. Spontaneous remission with normal development has been observed in a few untreated cases. Complete seizure control can be achieved in about half of the cases with antiepileptic drug treatment (Doose and Baier 1987b; Dulac et al. 1990). In the remainder of cases, the level of intelligence deteriorates and the children become severely intellectually disabled. Other neurologic abnormalities such as ataxia, poor motor function, dysarthria, and poor language development may emerge (Doose 1992b). However, this proportion may not be representative because in this series the data were collected in an institution for children with severe epilepsy.

The outcome is unfavorable if generalized tonic-clonic, tonic, or clonic seizures appear at the onset or occur frequently during the course. Generalized tonic-clonic seizures usually occur during the daytime in this disorder, at least in the early stages. Nocturnal generalized tonic-clonic seizures, which may develop later, are another unfavorable sign. If tonic seizures appear, prognosis is poor.

Status epilepticus with myoclonic, astatic, myoclonic-astatic, or absence seizures is another ominous sign, especially when prolonged or appearing early.

Failure to suppress the EEG abnormalities (4- to 7-Hz rhythms and spike-wave discharges) during therapy and absence of occipital alpha-rhythm with therapy also suggest a poor prognosis (Doose 1992a).

History
Myoclonic-astatic epilepsy was first described and identified in 1970 by Hermann Doose as an epilepsy syndrome, hence its original label, Doose syndrome.</ref> 1989, it was classified as a symptomatic generalized epilepsy by the International League Against Epilepsy (ILAE).

See also
SLC6A1 epileptic encephalopathy

References

External links 
 

Epilepsy types
Neurological disorders in children
Syndromes